The '48 Smallholders Party (48KGP) was a political party in Hungary during the early 1920s.

History
The party first contested national elections in 1922, winning two seats in the parliamentary elections that year.

After 1922 the party did not contest any further elections.

References

Defunct political parties in Hungary
Political parties with year of establishment missing
Political parties with year of disestablishment missing